Vice Admiral Sir John Maurice Mansfield KCB, DSO, DSC (22 December 1893 – 4 February 1949) was a Royal Navy officer who became Flag Officer Submarines.

Naval career
Educated at the Royal Naval College, Osborne, and the Royal Naval College, Dartmouth, Mansfield joined the Royal Navy in 1906. After serving in the First World War, he became commanding officer of the cruiser HMS Norfolk in October 1937 and of the cruiser HMS Devonshire in May 1939. He saw action during the early stages of Second World War participating in the Norwegian Campaign and evacuating the Norwegian Royal Family and Government officials from Tromsø, Norway on 7 June 1940, two months after Germany had invaded. He went on to be Chief of Staff, Western Approaches in February 1941 and commander of the 15th Cruiser Squadron in January 1944, in which role he provided support for the landings at Anzio.

Mansfield became Assistant Chief of the Naval Staff for Trade in 1945 and Flag Officer Submarines in November 1946. He retired due to ill health in August 1948.

References

Sources

1893 births
1949 deaths
Graduates of Britannia Royal Naval College
People from Bracknell
Royal Navy personnel of World War I
Royal Navy officers of World War II
Royal Navy vice admirals
Military personnel from Berkshire
Knights Commander of the Order of the Bath
Companions of the Distinguished Service Order
Recipients of the Distinguished Service Cross (United Kingdom)
People educated at the Royal Naval College, Osborne